Catabrosa is a small but widespread genus of plants in the grass family native to temperate areas of Eurasia, the Americas, and a few places in Africa.

Catabrosa aquatica is in flower in Europe from June to August, and the seeds ripen from July to September. The flowers are hermaphrodite (have both male and female organs) and are pollinated by wind. They are a short, bluntleaved plants similar to Poa trivialis, which grows in wetland.

Species
 Accepted species
 Catabrosa aquatica (L.) Beauv. - Europe, Russia, China, Mongolia, Central Asia, Greenland, Canada, United States, southern Argentina, southern Chile 
 Catabrosa drakensbergensis (Hedberg & I.Hedberg) Soreng & Fish - Lesotho, KwaZulu-Natal 
 Catabrosa werdermannii (Pilg.) Nicora & Rúgolo - Chile, Bolivia, Argentina

 formerly included
Numerous names have been created in the genus that are no longer widely accepted. Some of these names are now regarded as synonymous with the accepted names listed above. Other names refer to species now considered to be better suited to other genera. The following list gives the Catabrosa name followed by the currently accepted name, in order to help you find appropriate information.
Links to genera: Arctagrostis Antinoria Colpodium Deschampsia Eragrostis Glyceria Hyalopoa Periballia Phippsia Poa Puccinellia

See also
 List of Poaceae genera

References

External links

Pooideae
Poaceae genera